Pieces is a compilation of alternate takes and outtakes from Stephen Stills’s band Manassas's two albums, 1972’s Manassas and 1973’s Down the Road. Released in 2009.

Background 
"This is the first in a series of retrospective recordings that Stills plans to issue, among them a box set, a live set, and (in association with Experience Hendrix) an album of studio session demos he recorded with Jimi Hendrix, his then guitar teacher (Hendrix appeared on Stills' debut solo effort), as well as a live compilation." The songs were recorded from late 1971-1973, during rehearsals at Stills English mansion, Criteria Studios, and in Colorado, with the exception of 'My Love Is a Gentle Thing' which was recorded in 1975.

Songs 
"Witching Hour" - Left off the debut, but later rerecorded for Chris Hillman's first solo album. 

"Sugar Babe" - A rehearsal of the song that would become a staple of the bands live shows.

"Lies" - The original version of the song recorded in Criteria Studios, Miami, with Joe Walsh guesting on guitar.

"My Love Is a Gentle Thing" - Stills' love song to his beloved Hawaiian Islands; alone and overdubbed in the middle of 1975 at Criteria.

"Like a Fox" - Uncompleted song, Bonnie Raitt turned up to sing the chorus.

"Word Game" - Electric version recorded during a Manassas rehearsal.

"Tan Sola y Triste" - A lyric-less jam for the second album, that turned into "Pensamiento".

"Fit to Be Tied" - Later reworked and rerecorded as "Shuffle Just as Bad" for the 1975 Stills album.

"Love and Satisfy" - Originally recorded for Down the Road, but left off at the last minute. Later remade for The Souther-Hillman-Furay Band.

"High and Dry" - A slow blues jam - based on a riff from Ray Charles' version of Doc Pomus' "Lonely Avenue" - was often jammed and recorded as a warm up. The live audience sound heard here was added as a studio experiment. 

"Panhandle Rag" - Stills and the Burrito Boys, jamming during the first week in Miami. Joe Lala is playing the tempo on a box, Bryon Berline is playing fiddle, and Chris Hillman is playing mandolin.

"Uncle Pen" - Byron Berline sings this Bill Monroe tune, with Stills flat-picking guitar and Chris Hillman playing Mandolin.

"Do You Remember the Americans" - Earlier version than released, with Al Perkins bluegrass banjo to the fore.

"Dim Lights, Thick Smoke, (And Loud, Loud Music)" - Another one the Burritos had been playing live. 

"I Am My Brother" - Stills playing alone.

Track listing

References

External links
 Stephen Stills official website

Manassas (band) albums
Rhino Records albums